|}

The Prix Eclipse is a Group 3 flat horse race in France open to two-year-old thoroughbreds. It is run at Chantilly over a distance of 1,200 metres (about 6 furlongs), and it is scheduled to take place each year in October.

History
The event is named after the 18th-century racehorse Eclipse. It was established in 1891, and was originally contested at Maisons-Laffitte over 1,200 metres. It was extended to 1,400 metres in 1905, and to 1,600 metres in 1908.

The race was abandoned throughout World War I, with no running from 1914 to 1918. It was run over 1,500 metres in 1919. It was transferred to Saint-Cloud and cut to 1,300 metres in 1920. It returned to Maisons-Laffitte in 1923, and reverted to 1,200 metres in 1925.

Due to World War II, the Prix Eclipse was cancelled from 1939 to 1944. It resumed at Saint-Cloud with a distance of 1,500 metres in 1945. It was contested over 1,200 metres in 1946, and 1,600 metres in 1947. A new period over 1,200 metres began in 1948.

The race was run over 1,300 metres at Maisons-Laffitte in 1954. It returned to its previous length at Saint-Cloud in 1955. It was restored to 1,300 metres in 1966.

The Prix Eclipse was staged at Deauville from 1994 to 1996, and Saint-Cloud from 1997 to 2000. It was switched to Maisons-Laffitte and shortened to 1,200 metres in 2001.

In recent years, the race has had spells at Maisons-Laffitte (2001–03, 2005, 2010–11, 2016) and Chantilly (2004, 2006–09, 2012–2015).

Records
Leading jockey (4 wins):
 Léon Flavien – Ara (1956), Megare (1958), Bondolfi (1959), Belmont (1969)
 Freddy Head – Prompt (1965), Targowice (1972), Aerosol (1976), Breath Taking (1984)

Leading trainer (6 wins):
 William Webb – Tournesol (1892), Beatrix (1894), Croix du Sud (1900), La Lorelei (1901), Zingara (1903), Ossian (1908)

Leading owner (5 wins):
 Edmond Blanc – Rueil (1891), Manitou (1897), Adam (1904), Belle Fleur (1905), Sloughi (1913)

Winners since 1978

 The 2004 winner Tremar was later exported to Hong Kong and renamed Imperial Applause.

Earlier winners

 1891: Rueil
 1892: Tournesol
 1893: Melchior
 1894: Beatrix
 1895: Olmutz
 1896: Magister
 1897: Manitou
 1898: Listo
 1899: Agathos
 1900: Croix du Sud
 1901: La Loreley
 1902: Rafale
 1903: Zingara
 1904: Adam
 1905: Belle Fleur
 1906: Muscadet
 1907: Lamaneur
 1908: Ossian
 1909: M'Amour
 1910: Alcantara
 1911: Rodriguez
 1912: Sans le Sou
 1913: Sloughi
 1914–18: no race
 1919: Campistron
 1920: Cortland
 1921: Frisky
 1922: Sir Gallahad
 1923: Tonton
 1924: Coram
 1925: Asterus
 1926: Basilisque
 1927: Cestona
 1928: Touchaud
 1929: Monsieur Loyal
 1930: Alluvial
 1931: Present
 1932: Pampilhosa
 1933: Rentenmark
 1934: Le Gazon
 1935: Alcali
 1936: Le Chari
 1937: Salieri
 1938: Birikil
 1939–44: no race
 1945: Carrousel
 1946: Djama
 1947:
 1948: Gismonda
 1949: Major Morgane
 1950: Astrild
 1951:
 1952: Arzetto
 1953: Prudence
 1954: Fakahina
 1955: Vareta
 1956: Ara
 1957: Naharo
 1958: Megare
 1959: Bondolfi
 1960: Moskova
 1961: Prince Altana
 1962:
 1963: Belle Sicambre
 1964: Radames
 1965: Prompt
 1966: Ascanio
 1967: Cabhurst
 1968: Oris
 1969: Belmont
 1970: Stratege
 1971: Pompous
 1972: Targowice
 1973: Northern Taste
 1974: Prince Show
 1975: Roan Star
 1976: Aerosol
 1977: Binky

See also
 List of French flat horse races

References
 France Galop / Racing Post:

 france-galop.com – A Brief History: Prix Eclipse.
 galopp-sieger.de – Prix Eclipse.
 horseracingintfed.com – International Federation of Horseracing Authorities – Prix Eclipse (2016).
 pedigreequery.com – Prix Eclipse.

Flat horse races for two-year-olds
Chantilly Racecourse
Horse races in France
Recurring sporting events established in 1891